Loop entropy is the entropy lost upon bringing together two residues of a polymer within a prescribed distance.  For a single loop, the entropy varies logarithmically with the number of residues  in the loop

This entropy formula corresponds to a power-law distribution  for the probability of the residues contacting.

The loop entropy may also vary with the position of the contacting residues.  Residues near the ends of the polymer are more likely to contact (quantitatively, have a lower ) than those in the middle (i.e., far from the ends), primarily due to excluded volume effects.

Wang-Uhlenbeck entropy
The loop entropy formula becomes more complicated with multiples loops, but may be determined for a Gaussian polymer using a matrix method developed by Wang and Uhlenbeck. Let there be  contacts among the residues, which define  loops of the polymers. The entropy of making the specified contacts equals

As an example, consider the entropy lost upon making the contacts between residues 26 and 84 and residues 58 and 110 in a polymer (cf. ribonuclease A).  The first and second loops have lengths 58 (=84-26) and 52 (=110-58), respectively, and they have 26 (=84-58) residues in common.  The corresponding Wang-Uhlenbeck matrix is

whose determinant is 2340.  Taking the logarithm and multiplying by the constants  gives the entropy.

References
 Wang, M. C., & Uhlenbeck, G. E. (1945). On the theory of the Brownian motion II. Reviews of Modern Physics, 17(2-3), 323.

Thermodynamic entropy
Polymer physics